Campbell Millar (September 9, 1927 – July 9, 2020) was an athlete in football, hockey and golf. He was born in Portage La Prairie. He was a Canadian football 1946 to 1950 player who played for the Calgary Stampeders and Winnipeg Blue Bombers and University of Manitoba. He also played ice hockey and captained the Winnipeg Monarchs, who won the Memorial Cup in 1946. Golfer and Manitoba Junior Golf Champion in 1941. He was inducted into the Manitoba Sports Hall of Fame in 2000. Millar was a lawyer after his sporting days, working in the oil and gas industry while living in Calgary, Alberta.

References

1927 births
2020 deaths
Winnipeg Blue Bombers players